Stephen Kupakwesu Bush (born 21 March 1990) is a British journalist. He is columnist and associate editor at the Financial Times and has also written for The Guardian, The Telegraph, i and New Statesman.

Early life and education 
Bush is mixed race with Jewish heritage. He was educated at Morpeth School, a state comprehensive school in Globe Town, near Bethnal Green in East London, followed by Balliol College at the University of Oxford, where he studied history. 

At university, he was a member of the Oxford University Labour Club and volunteered for Andy Burnham's unsuccessful campaign to become Labour Party leader in 2010. Bush matriculated in 2008 and graduated in 2011. He supports Arsenal football club.

Career 
Bush worked for the magazine Progress (linked to the organisation of the same name) before writing for The Daily Telegraph, including working on the Morning Briefing email as editorial assistant to Benedict Brogan. He joined the New Statesman from the Telegraph in February 2015. Later that year, he was the first political commentator to predict Jeremy Corbyn's election as Labour leader after obtaining leaked internal poll data. 

He has appeared on the BBC's current affairs programme Newsnight, commenting on UK politics, and was tipped as an outsider to succeed Nick Robinson as the BBC's political editor in 2015, a position that eventually went to Laura Kuenssberg. From 2016 to 2017, he contributed a weekly column to The Guardians Lifestyle pages on cooking, called "The Delia Project", where he recounted his efforts to relearn cookery skills using only Delia Smith's Delia's Complete How to Cook.  

In December 2018 he was appointed political editor of the New Statesman, while also writing a fortnightly column for the i newspaper. He eventually left the publication in February 2022 to become a columnist and associate editor at the Financial Times, where he continues to write a morning political briefing email. 

While at the New Statesman he was appointed to chair the Board of Deputies of British Jews' commission on racial inclusivity within the Jewish community. He recommended the Jewish community adopt a "proactive attitude to inclusion" to draw in "people of all backgrounds who have felt marginalised, left out or turned off from Jewish life".

Awards 
In 2015 Bush received a commendation and was runner-up in the Young Journalist of the Year awards category in the Press Awards.

In 2017, he was awarded the Political Studies Association's Journalist of the Year award.

References 

Living people
1990 births
21st-century British Jews
Alumni of Balliol College, Oxford
Black British journalists
British Jewish writers
British male journalists
British political commentators
Financial Times people
Jewish journalists
New Statesman people
The Daily Telegraph people